Sasovo is a town in Ryazan Oblast, Russia, located on the Tsna River (Oka's basin)  southeast of Ryazan. Population:

History
Sasovo was founded in 1642 and granted town status in 1926. In the early 17th century, the village of Sasovo was owned by the descendants of Siberian Khan Kuchum who also ruled in Kasim Khanate at that time.

Administrative and municipal status
Within the framework of administrative divisions, Sasovo serves as the administrative center of Sasovsky District, even though it is not a part of it. As an administrative division, it is incorporated separately as the town of oblast significance of Sasovo—an administrative unit with the status equal to that of the districts. As a municipal division, the town of oblast significance of Sasovo is incorporated as Sasovo Urban Okrug.

Notable residents 

Nikolay Makarov (1914–1988), Soviet firearms designer, born in Sasovo
Viktor Zolotov (born 1954), Director of the National Guard of Russia, born in Sasovo

References

Notes

Sources

Cities and towns in Ryazan Oblast
Yelatomsky Uyezd